Dale Clarke (born March 23, 1978) is a Canadian professional ice hockey defenceman. He is currently playing for Tappara in SM-liiga.

Clarke played three games in the National Hockey League (NHL) for the St. Louis Blues. He previously played in Finland for Espoo Blues, HIFK and in Germany's Deutsche Eishockey Liga (DEL) for the Wolfsburg Grizzly Adams and the Kassel Huskies.

Playing career
As a youth, Clarke played in the 1992 Quebec International Pee-Wee Hockey Tournament with the Quinte minor ice hockey team from Belleville, Ontario.

Clarke played junior hockey for the Wellington Dukes of the Metro Toronto Junior Hockey League (MTHL) from 1994 until 1996. He attended St. Lawrence University and played four seasons from 1996 until 2000. In 2000, he signed with the St. Louis Blues of the National Hockey League (NHL) and joined their American Hockey League (AHL) affiliate the Worcester IceCats in time for the playoffs.

He played two seasons for the IceCats and had a three-game call-up to the Blues. In 2002–03 he was traded by the Blues to the Colorado Avalanche organization, joining their AHL affiliate Hershey Bears. He then split time with the Cincinnati Mighty Ducks of the AHL to end the season. Since 2003, he has played in Europe for teams in Finland and Germany.

On January 16, 2013, Clarke signed a contract midway through the 2012–13 season to return for a third stint with Tappara of the Finnish SM-liiga.

Career statistics

Transactions
 July 24, 1999 - Signed as a free agent by the St. Louis Blues 	 	
 December 5, 2002 - Traded to Colorado by St. Louis for future considerations.
 April 16, 2010 - Signed a contract with Brynäs IF
 November 18, 2011 - Signed a contract with Espoo Blues
 January 16, 2013 - Signed a contract with Tappara

References

External links

1978 births
Living people
Brynäs IF players
Canadian ice hockey defencemen
Cincinnati Mighty Ducks players
Grizzlys Wolfsburg players
Espoo Blues players
Hershey Bears players
HIFK (ice hockey) players
Ice hockey people from Ontario
Kassel Huskies players
Peoria Rivermen (ECHL) players
St. Lawrence Saints men's ice hockey players
St. Louis Blues players
Sportspeople from Sarnia
Tappara players
Undrafted National Hockey League players
Worcester IceCats players
Canadian expatriate ice hockey players in Finland
Canadian expatriate ice hockey players in Germany
Canadian expatriate ice hockey players in Sweden